During the 16th Canadian Parliament, women sat as members for the first time in both the House of Commons and the Senate. Two women ran for seats in the Canadian House of Commons in the 1926 federal election but Agnes Macphail, first elected in 1921, continued to be the only woman elected.

In February 1930, Cairine Wilson was named to the Canadian senate, becoming the first woman named to that body.

Party Standings

Members of the House of Commons

Senators

References 

Lists of women politicians in Canada